The French destroyer Amiral Sénès was a 1916 Type Large Torpedo Boat (Großes Torpedoboot) of the Imperial German Navy during World War I. Built as SMS S113 she was the first ship of her class to be laid down, but the second and final ship of her class to be launched.

Design

Traditionally, the Imperial German Navy designed its torpedo boats for the primary role of torpedo attack against hostile fleets while operating with the High Seas Fleet in the North Sea, rather than defence against enemy torpedo boats. The outbreak of the First World War, resulted in Germany seizing four large destroyers that were being built by Germaniawerft for Argentina (which entered service as the ), and building the eight large  torpedo boats to take advantage of machinery that was being built by German suppliers for Russia. While much bigger than existing German torpedo boats, which led to concerns that they would not fit in with German tactics for use of torpedo boats, they proved successful in service equipping the 2nd Torpedo-boat Flotilla. The success of these larger ships resulted in a requirement for a second flotilla of large torpedo boats. The new class would be designed around its gun armament, and it was decided to switch to  guns to ensure they would not be outgunned by British destroyers, which were expected to be fitted with  guns soon. While they would be considered a destroyer in any other navy, the German Navy nevertheless retained the "torpedo boat" classification for these ships (although they, along with the B97s and G101s were often called destroyers). On 15 April 1916, the German Navy placed orders for three ships each with the shipyards Schichau-Werke, A. G. Vulcan, Germaniawerft and Blohm & Voss.

Armament consisted of four 15 cm SK L/45 guns and four  torpedo tubes.

Service

Built by the Schichau-Werke in Elbing, Prussia, (now Elbląg, Poland) with the yard number 983, S113 she was launched on 31 January 1918 and completed on 5 August 1918.

S113, together with sister-ship , formed the 12th Torpedo-boat flotilla at the end of the First World War. S113 never saw service during World War I as she was commissioned near the end of hostilities. S113 was at first retained by Germany after the end of the war, but after the German fleet interned at Scapa scuttled itself on 21 June 1919, Germany was required to hand over more warships and equipment, including S113, to the Allies under the Treaty of Versailles to compensate for the ships scuttled at Scapa.

The Allies decided to transfer 10 destroyers from the ships surrendered from the German and Austro-Hungarian to each of the French and Italian navies to replace wartime losses, with France choosing S113 as part of her allocation. She was transferred to the French Navy on 23 May 1920 and renamed Amiral Sénès. Amiral Sénès served in the French Navy until 1936 when she was used for gunnery practice and sunk on 19 July 1938.

See also

Notes

References

External links
Emmerich, M Großes Torpedoboot 1916  (2003) German Naval History

Torpedo boats of the Imperial German Navy
1918 ships
Ships built in Elbing
Ships built by Schichau
World War I torpedo boats of Germany
Destroyers of the French Navy
Ships sunk as targets
Maritime incidents in 1938